Gabriel Pawel Slonina (born May 15, 2004) is an American professional soccer player who plays as a goalkeeper for Premier League club Chelsea and the United States national team.

Club career

Chicago Fire 
Born in Addison, Illinois, Slonina joined the youth academy of Major League Soccer club Chicago Fire in 2013. On March 8, 2019, Slonina signed a professional homegrown player contract with the club. At the age of 14, Slonina became the second youngest signing in Major League Soccer history and the youngest signing ever for the Chicago Fire.

On August 4, 2021, Slonina made his professional debut for the Chicago Fire against New York City FC, becoming the youngest starting goalkeeper in league history at 17 years, 81 days. Slonina made four saves for the Fire as the match ended in a 0–0 draw which made him the youngest goalkeeper to record a clean sheet in Major League Soccer history.

Chelsea 
On August 2, 2022, Slonina signed for Premier League club Chelsea for a transfer fee of $10 million, potentially rising to $15 million with add-ons.

Loan to Chicago Fire 
Slonina remained with the Chicago Fire on loan to complete the remainder of the MLS season, before joining Chelsea on January 1, 2023.

Return to Chelsea 
Slonina made his debut in a Chelsea shirt for the under-21 team in a Professional Development League match vs. Wolves on January 13, 2023.

International career 
Slonina has represented the United States at the under-15, under-16, under-17, and under-20 levels. Slonina was called into camp for the United States senior team in December 2021 but did not feature in a match. On January 21, 2022, Slonina was called into a World Cup Qualifying camp with the United States senior team but again did not feature in a match. On May 17, he was called up to the Polish senior team by coach Czesław Michniewicz for their upcoming Nations League fixtures against Wales, Belgium and the Netherlands. Three days later, Slonina rejected the call-up and declared his wish to represent United States on international level. On January 25, 2023, Slonina became the youngest ever Goalkeeper to play for the United States senior team, making multiple crucial saves including a goal line clearance.

Personal life 
Born in the United States, he is of Polish descent and was eligible to represent the United States or Poland internationally.

Career statistics

Club

International

References

External links 
 Gabriel Slonina at Chicago Fire
 

2004 births
Living people
American soccer players
Association football goalkeepers
Chicago Fire FC players
Chelsea F.C. players
Major League Soccer players
Soccer players from Illinois
Sportspeople from DuPage County, Illinois
People from Addison, Illinois
American people of Polish descent
Homegrown Players (MLS)
United States men's under-20 international soccer players
United States men's youth international soccer players
American expatriate soccer players
American expatriate sportspeople in England
Expatriate footballers in England
United States men's international soccer players